The Taylor–Mayo House, also known as the Mayo Memorial Church House, is a historic home located in Richmond, Virginia.  It was built in 1845, and is a two-story, five bay, Greek Revival style dwelling topped by a hipped roof.  The front facade features a three-bay two-story Ionic order portico. The house was elaborately renovated during the 1880s.

It was listed on the National Register of Historic Places in 1973.

References

Houses on the National Register of Historic Places in Virginia
Greek Revival houses in Virginia
Houses completed in 1845
Houses in Richmond, Virginia
National Register of Historic Places in Richmond, Virginia